Elias Cayaba Bulut Jr. (born May 15, 1970) is a Filipino politician and the current governor of Apayao province. A member of the Nationalist People's Coalition, he has been elected to three terms as a Member of the House of Representatives of the Philippines, representing the Lone District of Apayao. First elected in 2001, he was re-elected in 2004 and 2007.

References

 

|-

|-

|-

1970 births
Living people
Nationalist People's Coalition politicians
Members of the House of Representatives of the Philippines from Apayao
People from Apayao
Governors of Apayao